Herman may refer to:

People
 Herman (name), list of people with this name
 Saint Herman (disambiguation)
 Peter Noone (born 1947), known by the mononym Herman

Places in the United States
 Herman, Arkansas
 Herman, Michigan
 Herman, Minnesota
 Herman, Nebraska
 Herman, Pennsylvania
 Herman, Dodge County, Wisconsin
 Herman, Shawano County, Wisconsin
 Herman, Sheboygan County, Wisconsin

Place in India 
 Herman (Village)

Other uses
 Herman (comic strip)
 Herman (film), a 1990 Norwegian film
 Herman the Bull, a bull used for genetic experiments in the controversial lactoferrin project of GenePharming, Netherlands
 Herman the Clown, a Finnish TV clown from children's TV show performed by Veijo Pasanen
 Herman's Hermits, a British pop combo
 Herman cake (also called Hermann), a type of sourdough bread starter or Amish Friendship Bread starter
 Herman (album) by 't Hof Van Commerce

See also
 Hermann (disambiguation)
 Arman (name)
 Armand (disambiguation)
 Germanus (disambiguation)
 Germán
 Germain (disambiguation)